Nelmerson Xavier Mariano Silvano Angela (born February 20, 1998) is a Curaçaoan professional baseball baseball pitcher.

Angela signed with the New York Mets and spent 2015 with the DSL Mets where he was 2-1 with a 2.70 ERA in 13.1 innings pitched out of the bullpen. In 2016, he returned to the DSL Mets and compiled 3-0 record, 1.88 ERA, and 0.89 WHIP in 14 games (six starts) and in 2017, he once again returned to the DSL, going 2-0 with a 1.90 ERA in ten games (five starts). 

Angela was named to  the Netherlands national baseball team for the 2017 World Baseball Classic.

The Mets released Angela on September 4, 2018.

References

External links

1998 births
Living people
People from Willemstad
Curaçao baseball players
Baseball pitchers
Dominican Summer League Mets players
2017 World Baseball Classic players
Minor league baseball players
Curaçao expatriate baseball players in the Dominican Republic